Newton Island is part of the Great Barrier Reef Marine Park and the southernmost island in the Howick Group National Park and is about 100 km south-east of Cape Melville, Queensland. It is around 43 hectares or 0.43 square km in size.

The island is west of Howick Island.

References

Islands on the Great Barrier Reef